Ali Thiabat (born April 3, 1980) is a Jordanian footballer who plays as a right back for Al-Ahli.

References

External links 
 
 jo.gitsport.net
 

Association football defenders
Al-Ahli SC (Amman) players
Al-Ramtha SC players
Al-Baqa'a Club players
Al-Hussein SC (Irbid) players
Mansheyat Bani Hasan players
Al-Jazeera (Jordan) players
Jordanian footballers
1980 births
Living people
Sportspeople from Amman